Eusebio Sanz Asensio was a Spanish anarchist and military commander.

Biography 
Already a member of the National Confederation of Labor (CNT), at the outbreak of the Spanish Civil War, he joined the confederal militias and became a member of the Rosal Column, commanding an anarchist battalion that acted in the Sierra de Gredos and in Somosierra. Here he participated in the defense of Madrid.

In January 1937, following the militarization of the confederal militias, he was appointed commander of the 70th Mixed Brigade, which took part in the Battle of Jarama. Some time later he was sent to the north, where he commanded the 168th Mixed Brigade; at the head of this unit he took part in the Battle of Santander, trying to stop the nationalist advance. Later, after the fall of the northern front, he returned south to the central zone. He came to command the 25th and 22nd divisions, intervening in various military operations during the Levante Offensive.

References

Bibliography 
 
 
 
 
 

Spanish anarchists
Confederación Nacional del Trabajo members
Spanish military personnel of the Spanish Civil War (Republican faction)
Spanish army officers
20th-century Spanish military personnel
Year of birth missing
Year of death missing